Eamonn C. McKee is an Irish diplomat, currently ambassador to Canada, Jamaica and The Bahamas. He was formerly ambassador to Israel and South Korea.

McKee was born in Dublin. He studied at University College Dublin, and went on to receive a PhD in 1987 for his thesis on Irish economic policy 1939-52 from the National University of Ireland.
McKee joined the Department of Foreign Affairs in 1986 where he began the first of three periods of service in Anglo-Irish Division. He was first posted to the Embassy in Washington between 1990 and 1996. From 1999 to 2001 he served as a press officer at the Irish Consulate in New York.
 
After serving as head of the Justice and Security Section of Anglo-Irish Division, he was appointed head of Emergency and Recovery Section of Irish Aid in 2005.In 2006 he was appointed UN Director and Director of the Conflict Resolution Unit.
  
In August 2009 he was appointed as ambassador of Ireland to South Korea and to Israel in 2013. In 2015 he returned to headquarters to serve as Director of the Trade Division.

He was appointed ambassador to Canada in 2020.

McKee was a member of the talks team involved in the negotiation of the Good Friday Agreement of 1998 and later involved in its implementation.

References

External links
 Embassy of Ireland in Israel
 Blog

Year of birth missing (living people)
Living people
Ambassadors of Ireland to Israel
Ambassadors of Ireland to South Korea
Ambassadors of Ireland to Canada
Alumni of University College Dublin